Erwin Schück (1879 – 1919), better known by his stage name Erwin Sembach, was an opera singer with the Vienna Volksoper during its earliest years of producing operas, immediately before and during World War I. His greatest roles there were Masetto in Mozart's Don Giovanni, Papageno in Mozart's The Magic Flute, and Krušina in Smetana's The Bartered Bride.

(There was a successful German opera singer using the stage name Johannes Sembach during this same period, which may lead to some confusion when newspaper articles simply refer to the singer as "Herr Sembach".)

Biography 

Erwin Sembach was born on 18 October 1879 in Böhmisch Leipa (now Česká Lípa in the Czech Republic) to parents Adolf Schück and Katharina Schreiber who owned and operated a millinery and accessories shop in the town. Sembach was the oldest of eight siblings. He married Marie "Mietze" Klaus in 1902. They had a daughter Margarete Schück in 1903 and a son Wolfgang Schück (named after Wolfgang Amadeus Mozart) in 1905.

Sembach's family was quite musical, and as a young man he trained to be a singer. He was naturally a baritone, but trained himself to also sing tenor, so that he could qualify for more roles such as Wagner's Lohengrin and Siegfried. By 1910 Sembach and his family were living in Vienna, the music capital of Europe, and Sembach was singing operatic roles. He was a member of the Vienna Volksoper opera house from at least 1912 through 1917.

Sembach died of uremia in 1919 at the age of 40, following a long illness.

Operatic roles 

 Dr. Grenvil (bass) in La traviata by Giuseppe Verdi, Vienna, 1912–1913
 Brander in Faust by Charles Gounod, Vienna, 1913<ref>[http://anno.onb.ac.at/cgi-content/anno?aid=nwj&datum=19130420&query=%22Sembach%22&ref=anno-search&seite=24 Neues Wiener Journal, 20 April 1913]</ref>
 Der Kuhreigen by Wilhelm Kienzl, Plzeň, 1913
 Masetto (bass) in Don Giovanni by Wolfgang Mozart, Vienna, 1913
 Papageno (baritone) in The Magic Flute by Wolfgang Mozart, Vienna, 1914
 Fritz Kottner (baritone) in Die Meistersinger von Nürnberg by Richard Wagner, Vienna, 1914
 Jean in Bei Sedan by Heinrich Zöllner, Vienna, 1914
 Rodolphe in Der Überfall by Heinrich Zöllner, Vienna, 1914
 Count Liebnau (baritone) in Der Waffenschmied by Albert Lorzing, Vienna, 1914
 Count Ceprano (bass) in Rigoletto by Giuseppe Verdi, Vienna, 1914–1915
 Krušina (baritone) in The Bartered Bride by Bedřich Smetana, Vienna, 1915
 Reinmar von Zweter (bass) in Tannhäuser by Richard Wagner, Vienna, 1913–1915
 Silvio (baritone) in Pagliacci by Ruggero Leoncavallo, Vienna, 1915
 Fiorello (bass) in The Barber of Seville'' by Gioachino Rossini, Vienna, 1915

Recitals 

 Ústí nad Labem, 9 April 1905
 Vienna, 8 January 1912
 Vienna, 15 November 1912
 Olomouc, 29 November 1913
 Vienna, 20 February 1914
 Vienna, June 1915
 Česká Lípa, September 1918

References

External links
 

1879 births
1919 deaths
Operatic bass-baritones
Austrian operatic tenors
German Bohemian people
20th-century Austrian male opera singers
People from Česká Lípa